The 1926 Vermont Catamounts football team was an American football team that represented  the University of Vermont as an independent during the 1926 college football season. In their second year under head coach William McAvoy, the team compiled a 3–6 record. The 1926 season also marked the first as the "Catamounts" after it was selected by popular vote by the students over camel, cow and tomcat in May 1926.

Schedule

References

Vermont
Vermont Catamounts football seasons
Vermont Catamounts football